Gunhild Elise Øyangen (born 31 October 1947, in Levanger) is a former Norwegian politician for the Labour Party, most notably as Minister of Agriculture for the Second and Third cabinet Brundtland. She was  elected to  the Storting representing Sør-Trøndelag from 1989 to her retirement in 2005.

External links

www.gunhild-oyangen.no

Living people
1947 births
Labour Party (Norway) politicians
Members of the Storting
Women members of the Storting
Ministers of Agriculture and Food of Norway
21st-century Norwegian politicians
21st-century Norwegian women politicians
20th-century Norwegian politicians
20th-century Norwegian women politicians
Women government ministers of Norway
People from Levanger